Güreşen (Beğlevan) is a village in Borçka district of Artvin Province, Turkey. Its population is 666 (2021). It is close to the Georgian border to the east and Çoruh River to the south. Both the former and the present names of the village mean “wrestler”. Main economic activity of the watery village is agriculture.

History 
Most villagers are ethnically Laz or Hemshin.

References

Villages in Borçka District